Andrew Perne (1596–1654) was an English clergyman of Puritan opinions and member of the Westminster Assembly.

Life
He entered Peterhouse, Cambridge as a sizar in 1613, graduating B.A. in 1618 and M.A. in 1621.

He was fellow of Catherine Hall, Cambridge, from 1622 to 1627, when he was made rector of Wilby, Northamptonshire; he  was chosen in 1643 one of the four representatives from Northamptonshire to the Westminster Assembly. At this time he may have been sequestered from his living, and at St Dunstan-in-the-West. He preached two sermons before the House of Commons during the Long Parliament: one was on the occasion of a public fast, 31 May 1643, and was printed; the other on 23 April 1644, at the thanksgiving for Thomas Fairfax's victory at Selby.

He died at Wilby on 13 December 1654, and was buried in the chancel of his church, with an inscription to his memory. A funeral sermon by Samuel Ainsworth of Kelmarsh was published.

Notes

References

1596 births
1654 deaths
17th-century English Puritan ministers
Fellows of St Catharine's College, Cambridge
Westminster Divines
Alumni of Peterhouse, Cambridge